Nesbyen is a town and the administrative center in Nesbyen municipality in the county of Viken, Norway. Nesbyen is located in the traditional district of Hallingdal.

Summary
Nesbyen has a population of about 3,500 inhabitants. It is located on the Bergen Line railroad which runs between Oslo and Bergen. Nesbyen Station was opened in 1907 when the Bergen Railway was opened to Gulsvik. Nesbyen  is located on Norwegian National Road 7.

Gamle Nes is the oldest part of Nesbyen.  Nesbyen was an early  administrative center for  Hallingdal. Most buildings in Gamle Nes date to before 1900. Nesbyen is surrounded by mountains on several sides, with good roads to most mountain areas. Hallingnatten is the municipality's highest point, 1,314 meters above sea level. Hallingdal Museum, founded in 1899 and one of the oldest open air museums in Norway, is headquartered  in Nesbyen. The Hallingdal Museum organization has professional, administrative, and operational responsibility for the museums in Hallingdal.

Nesbyen  is listed as the location with the highest recorded temperature in Norway, with a record of  set on 20 June 1970. 

Nes kraftverk is a hydroelectric power station 4 km north of Nesbyen. The power plant was commissioned in 1967 and takes advantage of a drop of 285 meters from the Strandefjorden. It has four Francis turbines of 70 MW each and is the largest and lowest power plant in the Hallingdal River watershed (Hallingdalsvassdraget). The normal annual production is about 1330 GWh. Besides intake from Strandefjorden,  water is taken from the rivers Ridola, Lya, and Votna. Water is also transferred from the river Rukkedøla through a separate tunnel. The power plant is owned and operated by E-CO Energi.

Nes Church in Hallingdal (Nes kirke i Hallingdal) was constructed during 1861. The church has 500 seats and was constructed of timber on a foundation of natural stone. The design was by architect Georg Andreas Bull. Nes Chapel (Nes kapell) at Nes Cemetery was built in 1953–54. It was made as an imitation of the Nes Stave Church, which was demolished almost a hundred years earlier.

Notable residents

See also
Gardnos crater

References

External links
 Nesbyen Official website
Nes kommune Official website
 Gamle Nes official website)
Nes Church (Nesbyen) website

Villages in Buskerud
Nes, Buskerud